Anadolu (from Ancient Greek  , 'east') is the Turkish form of Anatolia, which refers to a region of the world that is now part of the nation of Turkey, also known as Asia Minor (Medieval and Modern Greek). 

Anadolu may also refer to:

Education 
Anadolu University, Turkish university
Bursa Anadolu Lisesi, Bursa Anatolian High School

Sports 
Anadolu Efes S.K., Turkish basketball club
Anadolu Üsküdar 1908, Turkish football club

Transportation 
Anadolu Airport, Turkish airport
AnadoluJet, Turkish airline
Isuzu (Anadolu), a coach-manufacturing company

Other uses 
Proper name of the star WASP-52
Anadolu Efes Biracılık ve Malt Sanayii A.Ş., Turkish brewing company
Anadolu Mecmuası, a periodical published by Hilmi Ziya Ülken and Reşat Kayı
Anadolu Agency, Turkish news agency
Anadolu Medical Center, hospital in Turkey
Anadolu pony, a breed of horse native to the region
Anadolu Shipyard, a Turkish shipbuilding company in the defense industry
Anadoluhisarı, a castle in Istanbul
, a planned amphibious assault ship of the Turkish navy

See also
 Anatolia (disambiguation)
 Anadol